= List of current NRLW captains and coaches =

This list includes the appointment date and performance record of the 10 current National Rugby League Women's head coaches.

Appointments that do not take immediate effect begin on 1 November.

== Coaches ==
Key
| Prem | Premiership wins |
| W | Wins |
| L | Losses |
| D | Draws |
| GC | Games coached |
| Win% | Winning percentage |
| † | Caretaker coach |

Statistics are correct to the end of the 2021 NRL season

| Team | Name | Start date (Note: Commencement date of current term at the team.) | Time as coach | Prem | W | L | D | GC | Win% | Prem | W | L | D | GC | Win% | Source |
| Team | Name | Start date | Time as coach | Current (Note: Coaching statistics from the current term with the team; coaching statistics from previous term with the team are not included.) | | | | | | Career (Note: Coaching statistics for career in the NRL, records in other leagues are not included.) | | | | | | Source |
|---|---|---|---|---|---|---|---|---|---|---|---|---|---|---|---|---|
| Brisbane | Scott Prince | 16 November 2022 | 5 years, 62 days | 0 | 31 | 32 | 0 | 65 | 49% | 0 | 31 | 32 | 0 | 65 | 49% | |
| Canberra | Darrin Borthwick | 13 October 2022 | 12 years, 62 days | 0 | 115 | 107 | 1 | 223 | 51.8% | 1 | 236 | 230 | 2 | 468 | 50.5% | |
| Cronulla-Sutherland | Tony Herman | 22 November 2022 | 4 years, 62 days | 0 | 26 | 13 | 0 | 39 | 66.6% | 0 | 26 | 13 | 0 | 39 | 66.6% | |
| Gold Coast | Karyn Murphy | 4 May 2022 | 2 years, 194 days | 0 | 1 | 1 | 0 | 2 | 50% | 0 | 1 | 1 | 0 | 2 | 50% | |
| Newcastle | Ronald Griffiths | 14 April 2022 | 6 years, 62 days | 0 | 32 | 46 | 2 | 80 | 41.5% | 0 | 32 | 46 | 2 | 80 | 41.5% | |
| North Queensland | Ben Jeffries | 29 November 2022 | 5 years, 62 days | 0 | 29 | 31 | 0 | 60 | 48% | 0 | 35 | 39 | 0 | 74 | 48.5% | |
| Parramatta | Dean Widders | 17 June 2021 | 12 years, 62 days | 0 | 131 | 115 | 0 | 246 | 53.3% | 0 | 131 | 115 | 0 | 246 | 53.3% | |
| St. George Illawarra | Jamie Soward | 21 October 2021 | 2 years, 231 days | 0 | 2 | 4 | 0 | 6 | 33% | 0 | 2 | 4 | 0 | 6 | 33% | |
| Sydney Roosters | John Strange | 25 February 2021 | 13 years, 62 days | 3 | 166 | 93 | 0 | 259 | 64.5% | 3 | 166 | 93 | 0 | 259 | 64.5% | |
| Wests Tigers | Brett Kimmorley | 14 October 2022 | 3 years, 62 days | 0 | 3 | 12 | 0 | 15 | 20% | 4 | 344 | 334 | 11 | 687 | 50.1% | |
